A list of films produced in France in 1947.

See also
 1947 in France

References

External links
 French films of 1947 at the Internet Movie Database
French films of 1947 at Cinema-francais.fr

1947
Films
Lists of 1947 films by country or language